Nebria lewisi is a species of ground beetle in the Nebriinae subfamily that is endemic to Kikuma, Ehime of Japan.

References

leonensis
Beetles described in 1874
Beetles of Asia
Endemic fauna of Japan